Hans Ørsted may refer to:
 Hans Christian Ørsted (1777–1851), Danish chemist and physicist
 Hans-Henrik Ørsted (born 1954), Danish track cyclist

See also
 Ørsted (disambiguation)